Nuestra Belleza Nuevo León 2007, was held at Las Lomas Eventos in Monterrey, Nuevo León on July 25, 2007. At the conclusion of the final night of competition, Anagabriela Espinoza of San Pedro Garza García was crowned the winner. Espinoza was crowned by outgoing Nuestra Belleza Nuevo León titleholder, Mariana Lombard. Eight contestants competed for the state title.

The pageant was hosted by Nuestra Belleza Nuevo León 1998 Silvia Salgado, Cecilia Gutiérrez & Patricio Cabezut.

Results

Placements

Judges
Priscila Perales - Nuestra Belleza México 2005 & Miss International 2007
Arturo Carmona - Actor
Susana Valdez - Journalist
Jesús Tovar - Photographer

Background Music
Lidia Ávila - "Ay Amor", "A Tu Medida" & "Cada Vez"
Reik

Contestants

References

External links
Official Website

Nuestra Belleza México